Edouard Mathos (June 28, 1948 – April 28, 2017) was a Roman Catholic bishop.

Ordained to the priesthood in 1977, Mathos served as auxiliary of the Roman Catholic Diocese of Bossangoa, Central African Republic from 1987 to 1991. He then served as auxiliary bishop of Bangui from 1991 to 2004. Mathos then served as bishop of the Diocese of Bambari from 2004 until his death in 2017.

Notes

1948 births
2017 deaths
20th-century Roman Catholic bishops in the Central African Republic
21st-century Roman Catholic bishops in the Central African Republic
Roman Catholic bishops of Bossangoa
Roman Catholic bishops of Bangui
Roman Catholic bishops of Bambari